Oocephalus is a genus of flowering plants belonging to the family Lamiaceae.

Its native range is Brazil to Bolivia.

Species
Species:

Oocephalus argyrophyllus 
Oocephalus crassifolius 
Oocephalus foliosus 
Oocephalus ganevii 
Oocephalus grazielae 
Oocephalus hagei 
Oocephalus halimifolius 
Oocephalus lacunosus 
Oocephalus lythroides 
Oocephalus niveus 
Oocephalus nubicola 
Oocephalus oppositiflorus 
Oocephalus pauciflorus 
Oocephalus petraeus 
Oocephalus piranii 
Oocephalus pubescens 
Oocephalus rigens 
Oocephalus silvinae 
Oocephalus tenuithyrsus

References

Lamiaceae
Lamiaceae genera